Strašnická is a Prague Metro station on Line A, located in Strašnice, Prague 10. It was opened on 11 July 1987 as the eastern terminus of the extension from Želivského. On 4 July 1990, the line was extended to Skalka. The station has only one concourse leading to Starostrašnická, which is connected to a fixed platform with stairs and a ramp for disabled passengers. The interior of the station is paneled with dark brown tiles. Construction of the station cost 241.4 million crowns.

Gallery

References

Prague Metro stations
Railway stations opened in 1987
1987 establishments in Czechoslovakia
Prague 10
Railway stations in the Czech Republic opened in the 20th century